Redortiers is a commune in the Alpes-de-Haute-Provence department in southeastern France.

The territory of the municipality includes the districts of Le Contadours, Les Martins and Le Poisson. The municipality borders on Les Omergues to the northwest, Montfroc to the northeast, La Rochegiron to the east, Banon to the southeast, Montsalier to the southwest and Revest-du-Bion to the west.

Population

See also
Communes of the Alpes-de-Haute-Provence department

References

Communes of Alpes-de-Haute-Provence
Dauphiné
Alpes-de-Haute-Provence communes articles needing translation from French Wikipedia